Pteropsaron is a genus of fish in the family Percophidae.

Species
There are currently 9 recognized species of this genus:
 Pteropsaron dabfar Iwamoto, 2014 
 Pteropsaron evolans D. S. Jordan & Snyder, 1902
 Pteropsaron heemstrai J. S. Nelson, 1982
 Pteropsaron incisum C. H. Gilbert, 1905
 Pteropsaron levitoni Iwamoto, 2014 
 Pteropsaron longipinnis G. R. Allen, Erdmann, 2012 (Midwater sand-diver)
 Pteropsaron natalensis J. S. Nelson, 1982
 Pteropsaron neocaledonicus Fourmanoir & Rivaton, 1979
 Pteropsaron springeri D. G. Smith & G. D. Johnson, 2007 (Springer's sand-diver)
Pterospsaron indicum, 2019

References

Percophidae
Marine fish genera
Taxa named by David Starr Jordan
Taxa named by John Otterbein Snyder